The Monaco Shooting Federation,  Monégasque Fédération Monégasque de Tir is the Monacan association for shooting sport under the International Practical Shooting Confederation (IPSC), the International Shooting Sport Federation (ISSF) and the Fédération Internationale de Tir aux Armes Sportives de Chasse.

See also 
 List of shooting sports organizations

Other umbrella organizations for shooting 
 Association of Maltese Arms Collectors and Shooters
 French Shooting Federation
 Finnish Shooting Sport Federation
 Hellenic Shooting Federation
 Norwegian Shooting Association
 Royal Spanish Olympic Shooting Federation
 Swiss Shooting Sport Federation

References

External links 
 Official homepage of the Monaco Shooting Federation

Regions of the International Practical Shooting Confederation
Shooting
Sports organizations established in 1921
1921 establishments in Monaco
National members of the European Shooting Confederation